Pichkhadze or Pitchhadze is a Georgian surname of Jewish origin which may refer to:

 Meir Pichhadze (1955–2010), Georgian-born Israeli painter
 Joseph Pitchhadze (born 1965), Georgian-born Israeli film director, producer and screenwriter

Georgian-language surnames
Jewish surnames